Palladium Square is a shopping mall currently under redevelopment in Ratchathewi district, Bangkok, Thailand. It was formerly known as "Pratunam Center".

Overview
The complex will be the largest wholesale and retail center of the Pratunam area.
Situated on 14 rai, or 240,000 square meters. It features fashion, appliances, IT products a large supermarket, brand names shops and restaurants. It is expected to be fully opened in mid-2011 with at least 200,000 customers a day. Great China Millennium (the operator of Bobae Mall) bought the complex in 2011. The former owners of Pratunam Center sold the complex because it was not successful.

Hotel/Office
Meanwhile, the shopping center features 2 office buildings and a 4-star, 800-room hotel building including room service. The hotel has been opened since early 2012.

Floors
 The Palladium Square
 Fashion
 Jewelry
 Mobile & IT
 Souvenirs
 Food
 Supermarket

The mall is located on Phetchaburi Road, opposite of Pantip Plaza and the Platinum Fashion Mall. It is also near CentralWorld.

See also
 List of shopping malls in Bangkok
 List of shopping malls in Thailand

References

External links
Palladium Square

Shopping malls in Bangkok
Ratchathewi district